StarGeezer is an album by  folk artist "Spider" John Koerner, released in 1996. Some of the songs are re-recordings of titles previously released by Koerner on albums that are no longer in print.

Reception

In his Allmusic review, critic Thom Owens wrote, "There aren't any standout songs, but the entire album has a relaxed, welcoming vibe that makes it quite a pleasant listen." Tom Sinclair of Entertainment Weekly called StarGeezer "a rootsy album of traditional folk and wry originals," and added that Koerner "shows that four decades of obscurity haven't diminished his talent for making engaging music out of wholly familiar elements."

Track listing
All songs traditional unless otherwise noted.
 "Intro" (traditional) – 0:40
 "Jack of Diamonds" – 2:28
 "Going Down Together" (John Koerner, Willie Murphy) – 3:17
 "Rattlesnake" – 1:37
 "Danville Girl" – 3:30
 "Last Lonesome Blues" (Koerner) – 4:19
 "Stewball" – 4:18
 "The Skipper and His Wife" – 3:29
 "Casey Jones" – 3:11
 "When First unto This Country" – 2:09
 "Thief River Falls" (Koerner, Murphy) – 2:54
 "Phoebe" – 3:13
 "The Days of Forty-Nine" – 3:06
 "The Golden Vanity" – 3:22
 "Some People Say" – 4:07
 "Taking My Time" – 5:41
 "Stardust" – 4:19

Personnel
"Spider" John Koerner – guitar, harmonica, vocals
Willie Murphy – piano, percussion, bass, vocals
Johnny Vidacovich – drums
Jan Cornish – percussion
Bill Hinkley – vocals
Reggie Houston – sax, percussion, shaker
Judy Larson – vocals
Eric Peltoniemi – vocals
Production notes
Willie Murphy – producer, mixing
Bob Feldman – executive producer
Mark Bingham – engineer
Chris Frymire – editing, pre-mastering
David Glasser – mastering
Tom Mudge – mixing
Eric Peltoniemi – coordination, mixing
Dan Corrigan – photography
Linda Beauvais – artwork, design

References

1996 albums
John Koerner albums
Albums produced by Willie Murphy (musician)